The Tiantai dialect, also known as Tiantaihua (Tiantai dialect pronunciation: [tʰi.tʰai.u]) is a regiolect of Wu Chinese in the Taizhou Wu dialect group. It is spoken in Tiantai County, Taizhou, Zhejiang province, China. 

Like other dialects in the Wu family, Tiantaihua has a three-way contrast between voiced, unaspirated voiceless, and aspirated initial consonants (e.g.), preserving an earlier feature of Chinese which Mandarin has collapsed into a two-way distinction.
The Tiantai dialect is the main representative of the northern Taizhou dialect family.

Comparison with Standard Chinese 
The meaning of many common words and phrases in the Tiantai dialect differs from that of Standard Chinese. Below is a list of common differences:

Proverbs and phrases in the Tiantai dialect can be shorter in comparison with the corresponding phrase in Standard Chinese. For example, the phrase "露出馬腳" (literally "exposing the cloven hoof", metaphorically "exposed") is shortened to the phrase "出腳", literally meaning "taking the foot out".

Sentences can be shorter as well; see the example below.

Pronouns

Syllable structure

Initials

Finals

Tones 
There are 8 tones in the Tiantai dialect, which are obtained by splitting each of the four tones in Mandarin to yin (陰) and yang (陽).

References 

Wu Chinese
Taizhou, Zhejiang